Geophis brachycephalus, also known as the Costa Rican earth snake, is a snake of the colubrid family. It is found in Costa Rica and Panama.

References

Geophis
Snakes of North America
Reptiles of Costa Rica
Reptiles of Panama
Taxa named by Edward Drinker Cope
Reptiles described in 1871